Matthew Riccitello (born March 5, 2002) is an American professional road cyclist, who currently rides for UCI ProTeam .

Major results

2019
 2nd Time trial, National Junior Road Championships
 2nd Overall Tour de l'Abitibi
1st  Young rider classification
 5th Overall Grand Prix Rüebliland
 7th Overall Tour du Pays de Vaud
2020
 1st Mount Graham Hill Climb
 3rd Overall Valley of the Sun Stage Race
2021
 1st FlapJack Flats Time Trial
2022
 1st  Overall Istrian Spring Trophy
 4th Time trial, National Under-23 Road Championships
2023
 9th Overall Vuelta a San Juan
1st  Young rider classification

References

External links

2002 births
Living people
Cyclists from Arizona
Sportspeople from Tucson, Arizona
American male cyclists